Mats Einarsson (born 1960) is a Swedish Left Party politician, member of the Riksdag 1998–2006.

In the Riksdag, he was a member of the Constitution Committee 1998–2006 and a member of the Council of Europe's Swedish delegation in 2002. He was also a deputy in the Civil Affairs Committee, the EU Committee, the Defense Committee, the Constitution Committee, the Combined Constitution and Foreign Affairs Committee, the Complaints Committee and the Swedish Delegation of the Council of Europe.

References

1960 births
20th-century Swedish politicians
21st-century Swedish politicians
Living people
Members of the Riksdag 1998–2002
Members of the Riksdag 2002–2006
Members of the Riksdag from the Left Party (Sweden)